Hemyda is a genus of flies in the family Tachinidae.

Species
H. aurata Robineau-Desvoidy, 1830
H. conopoides Guimaraes, 1979
H. decumana Reinhard, 1958
H. hertingi Ziegler & Shima, 1996
H. obscuripennis (Meigen, 1824)
H. vittata (Meigen, 1824)
H. zonula Reinhard, 1951

References

Phasiinae
Diptera of Europe
Diptera of Asia
Diptera of North America
Diptera of South America
Tachinidae genera
Taxa named by Jean-Baptiste Robineau-Desvoidy